The Ahlen water tower is an industrial monument and landmark in the Ahlen, Germany.

From 1915 to 1917, the water tower served as the sole water supply for the Westphalia mine and the miners colony built in 1892 by Gelsenwasser AG.

Today the distinctive blue water tower is monument and is a historical example of the early development of riveting at the beginning of the 20th century.

Notes

Towers completed in 1892
Water towers in Germany
Westphalia